Euphilotes enoptes, the dotted blue, is a species of blue (Polyommatinae) butterfly in the family Lycaenidae. It is found in North America.

The MONA or Hodges number for Euphilotes enoptes is 4367.

Subspecies
 Euphilotes enoptes arenacola Pratt and J. Emmel in T. Emmel, 1998
 Euphilotes enoptes aridorum Austin in T. Emmel, 1998
 Euphilotes enoptes bayensis (Langston, 1964)
 Euphilotes enoptes cryptorufes Pratt and J. Emmel in T. Emmel, 1998
 Euphilotes enoptes dammersi (J. A. Comstock and Henne, 1933)
 Euphilotes enoptes enoptes (Boisduval, 1852) (Pacific dotted-blue)
 Euphilotes enoptes langstoni (Shields, 1975)
 Euphilotes enoptes opacapulla Austin in T. Emmel, 1998
 Euphilotes enoptes primavera Austin in T. Emmel, 1998
 Euphilotes enoptes smithi (Mattoni, 1954)
 Euphilotes enoptes tildeni (Langston, 1964)

References

 Pelham, Jonathan P. (2008). "A catalogue of the butterflies of the United States and Canada with a complete bibliography of the descriptive and systematic literature". Journal of Research on the Lepidoptera, vol. 40, xiv + 658.

Further reading

 Arnett, Ross H. (2000). American Insects: A Handbook of the Insects of America North of Mexico. CRC Press.

Euphilotes